Tan Ende (born August 21, 1971) is a retired Chinese football player. He is currently a coach.

Playing career
Tan Ende played the majority of his football career for Guangzhou Apollo where he would aid them to two runners-up positions for the league title. He would also see them become a professional football team, however he is often remembered for scoring the fastest goal in Chinese football history against Yanbian FC on June 2, 1996. Unsatisfied with the professionalism in the club he would become alienated within the team and would leave for Qingdao Jonoon before settling at second tier side Zhejiang Lücheng before he retired.

Management career
After he retired he would become a trainer for Zhejiang Lücheng's reserve team Hangzhou Sanchao until May 18, 2007 when he was promoted to be a trainer for the senior team. On September 20, 2009 the Head coach Zhou Suian was sacked as manager for the team and Tan Ende would follow him.

References

External links
Player profile at Sodasoccer.com

1971 births
Living people
Footballers from Guangzhou
Chinese footballers
Guangzhou F.C. players
Qingdao Hainiu F.C. (1990) players
Zhejiang Professional F.C. players
Chinese football managers
Meizhou Hakka F.C. managers

Association football forwards